Elections to Borough of Fylde were held on 2 May 2019 as part of the wider 2019 United Kingdom local elections.

Results summary
The results of the 2019 elections are summarised below.

Ward results

Ansdell

Ashton

Central

Clifton

Elswick and Little Eccleston

Fairhaven

Freckleton East

Freckleton West

Heyhouses

Kilnhouse

Kirkham North

Kirkham South

Medlar with Wesham

Newton and Treales

Park

Ribby with Wrea

Singleton and Greenhalgh

St. John's

St. Leonard's

Staining and Weeton

Warton and Westby

References

2019 English local elections
May 2019 events in the United Kingdom
2019
2010s in Lancashire